Robert Richie (born 1962) is the president and CEO of FairVote, a non-profit organization that researches and advocates election reforms that reports to increase voter turnout, accountable governance, and fair representation, including reforms such as instant runoff voting and the National Popular Vote plan. Richie has directed FairVote since its founding in 1992.

Early life and education
Born in Washington, D.C., Richie graduated from Haverford College with a B.A. in philosophy in 1987. Before co-founding FairVote and becoming its first executive director in 1992, he worked for three winning congressional campaigns in Washington state and non-profit organizations in Washington and the District of Columbia. He is married and has three children.

Activities
As a representative of FairVote, Richie has participated in many activities.
He addressed the Voting Section of the U. S. Department of Justice, the Texas Commission on Judicial Efficiency, the Lincoln Day dinners of the Alaska Republican Party in Juneau and Anchorage, the annual conventions of the American Political Science Association, National Association of Counties, Unitarian Universalism, and National Conference of State Legislatures and several groups of foreign dignitaries through the United States Information Agency. He worked with congressional staff in writing numerous pieces of legislation, including the States' Choice of Voting Systems Act (1999) and Bipartisan Federal Elections Review Act (2001). Testified in special sessions before charter commissions in Nassau County (New York), Miami Beach (Florida), Cincinnati (Ohio), Austin (Texas) and Detroit (Michigan) and before state legislative committees in Alaska, Vermont, Virginia and Washington and advised charter commissions and elected officials in several other cities and states. He helped organize seven well-attended national conferences on electoral system reform and worked with state reformers supporting fair election methods. He toured New Zealand at the invitation of electoral reformers during a successful referendum campaign in that country in 1993 to adopt a complete representation voting system.

In print

Richie is a frequent source for print, radio, and television journalists and has published a commentary in such publications as New York Times, Washington Post, Wall Street Journal, Roll Call, Nation, National Civic Review, Boston Review, Christian Science Monitor and Legal Times. His writings have appeared in eight books since 1999, including the feature essay in Whose Votes Count (Beacon Press, 2001). Richie has been a guest on many radio and television programs.

References

External links
 
 FairVote profile

Living people
People from Washington, D.C.
1962 births
Haverford College alumni